Señor Boombox (2002) is an album by Disco Biscuits.

The album charted on two Billboard Magazine entries; Top Electronic Albums at #13 and Top Independent Albums at #46.

Track listing
 "Hope" (Jon Gutwillig, David Murray) – 4:35
 "Float Like a Butterfly" (Sam Altman, Marc Brownstein, Gutwillig, Aron Magner, E.D. Clay) – 4:27
 "In the Sky" (Brownstein) – 0:46
 "Floodlights" (Brownstein) – 2:40
 "Jigsaw Earth" (Gutwillig, Dan Glimcher) – 7:15
 "Sugarcane" (Altman, Brownstein, Gutwillig, Magner, Audley Freed)– 1:08
 "Sound One" (Altman) – 3:30
 "The Tunnel" (Brownstein, Jerry Goldsmith) – 7:46
 "Sprawl" (Altman, Brownstein, Gutwillig, Magner) – 0:29
 "Floes" (Altman) – 7:24
 "Triumph"  (Brownstein)  – 3:33
 "Hope II" (Jon Gutwillig, David Murray) – 4:15
 "Hope III" (Jon Gutwillig, David Murray) – 15:37

Disco Biscuits albums
2002 albums